Rhododendron subgenus Pentanthera was a subgenus of the genus Rhododendron. The common name azalea is applied to many of the species, and also to species in some other subgenera. In 2005 it was discontinued and its four sections moved or dismembered.

The subgenus included four sections:
Rhododendron sect. Pentanthera
Rhododendron sect. Rhodora
Rhododendron sect. Sciadorhodion
Rhododendron sect. Viscidula

References

Bibliography
Huxley, A., ed. (1992). New RHS Dictionary of Gardening. Macmillan.

Pentanthera
Plant subgenera
Historically recognized angiosperm taxa